Lyn Philp (1924-1981) was a New Zealand professional boxer, and New Zealand's Bantamweight Champion from 1947 - 1954.

Ranked fourth best bantamweight New Zealand all-time greats.

With his punching power, speed and elusive style, Philp soon became the #1 contender for the bantamweight belt. In 1960 he was ranked third best bantamweight in New Zealand history.

Biography
During World War II, Philp was drafted into the New Zealand Army, serving with distinction in the Middle East and Japan in World War II.

Amateur career

In the spring of 1942, the United States First Marine Division sailed for Wellington, prior to opening a counteroffensive against the advancing Japanese forces. The marines were matched to fight local boxers on the preliminaries to the Strickland-Mullett heavyweight title fight. In the local team there appeared two Wellington fighters who were to turn professional after the war, Jack McCann and Lyn Philp. Both had wins over US Marines, and 15-year-old Bobby Goslin, drawn to meet P. Gonsalves, less than a minute later they were picking a semi-conscious Marine up off the deck! Goslin who would represent New Zealand at the 1948 Olympics. Philp, incidentally, fought Goslin three times, winning once and losing twice. Philp while serving with J Force in Japan after the war, he would win a tournament in Kure, beating an Australian in the final. Kure is at the southern end of Japan's main island Honshū. The allocated area of occupation included the Hiroshima Prefecture.

Professional career

He started his pro-career as a bantamweight joining the training stable of the legendary Dick Dunn. His first professional fight was a win against Ronnie Hawes on 21 April 1947 at Wellington Town Hall.

At Hastings New Zealand on 6 August 1947, and his second professional fight he met Tot Hoggarth the bantamweight champion in the first of three meetings between the pair, being defeated in round twelve. In his rematch with Tot Hoggarth, on 6 October 1947 at Petone New Zealand he won by KO, setting the stage for the final showdown and the battle for the belt.

The Philp-Hoggarth battle took place on 21 February 1948 at the Petone Recreation Ground New Zealand. For the third and final time they would meet to decide the champion. Hoggarth was stopped by knock-out, Philp winning the New Zealand bantamweight title and the belt. He retained the belt until his eventual retirement from the ring on 6 June 1954, when he vacated the title.

In 1954 he stepped up to featherweight fighting Johnny Hanks for the vacant featherweight title, losing by KO in round eight.

World Title Fight

He was matched for a world title bout against World Champion Jimmy Carruthers. For reasons unclear the fight never went ahead.

Career record

Personal life
After retiring from the ring Lyn Philp opened a boxing gym where he became a trainer and coach.

References

External links

New Zealand boxing matches - 1941 - 1950
New Zealand J Force

Sportspeople from Lower Hutt
New Zealand Army personnel
New Zealand people of World War II
New Zealand military personnel of World War II
New Zealand professional boxing champions
Bantamweight boxers
1924 births
1981 deaths
New Zealand male boxers